Jasiczek is a Polish surname. Notable people with the surname include:

 Henryk Jasiczek (1919–1976), Polish journalist, poet, writer, and activist
 Michał Jasiczek (born 1994), Polish alpine skier

Polish-language surnames